Laguna Beach Unified School District (LBUSD) is a public school district that serves the city of Laguna Beach and sections of the cities of Aliso Viejo, Laguna Woods and Newport Beach in Orange County, California, United States. The LBUSD oversees one high school (Laguna Beach High School), one middle school (Thurston Middle School) and two elementary schools (El Morro Elementary School and Top of the World Elementary School). For the 2012–2013 academic year, enrollment was 3045 students with approximately 250 students enrolled at each grade level from K to 12.

References

External links
 

School districts in Orange County, California
Laguna Beach, California